Sarah "Tabitha" Babbitt (born December 9, 1779, Hardwick, Massachusetts; died 10 December 1853 in Harvard) was a Shaker credited to be a tool maker and inventor. Inventions attributed to her by the Shakers include the circular saw, the spinning wheel head, and false teeth. She became a member of the Harvard Shaker community in 1793.

Personal life
Babbitt was born in Hardwick, Massachusetts, the daughter of Seth and Elizabeth Babbitt. On August 12, 1793, she became a member of the Shakers at the Harvard Shaker community in Massachusetts. In December 1853, Babbitt died in Harvard, Massachusetts.

Career

Toolmaker and inventor
Babbitt is credited with inventing the first circular saw for use in a saw mill in 1813. According to the Shakers, Babbitt was watching men use the difficult two-man whipsaw when she noticed that half of their motion was wasted. She proposed creating a round blade to increase efficiency. The circular saw was connected to a water-powered machine to reduce the effort to cut lumber. The first circular saw she allegedly made is in Albany, New York. In the summer of 1948, a version of Babbitt's saw, built to her specifications, was on display at a Shaker exhibit at Fenimore House in Cooperstown, N. Y., as a loan from the New York State Museum. Because Babbitt did not patent her circular saw and the reference to her invention exists only in Shaker lore, there is controversy over whether she was the true first inventor of the saw. According to some accounts, two French men patented the circular saw in the United States after reading about Babbitt's saw in Shaker papers. M. Stephen Miller argues that Babbitt was not the first inventor of the circular saw, based upon the date that she joined the sect. He contends that the circular saw was invented at Mount Lebanon Shaker Village by Amos Bishop or Benjamin Bruce in 1793 — or not by a Shaker at all. 

Babbitt is also credited with inventing a process for the manufacture of false teeth and an improved spinning wheel head. She also allegedly invented cut nails, although the Shakers also credit the invention to the non-Shaker, Eli Whitney. As a Shaker, Babbitt never patented any of her inventions.

Legacy 
The inventor Sam Asano in 2015 cited Babbitt, along with Benjamin Franklin, to argue why the National Inventors Hall of Fame inclusion criteria are flawed. The Inventors Hall requires proof of patent and because neither Babbitt nor Franklin filed patents, they are not included in the list.

See also 
 Isaac Babbitt, inventor of Babbitt metal alloy for bearings
 Shaker furniture

References

19th-century American inventors
1784 births
1853 deaths
Women inventors
People from Harvard, Massachusetts
Shaker members
People from Hardwick, Massachusetts
Inventors from Massachusetts